The Corinthian is a fictional character in Neil Gaiman's comic book series The Sandman.  He first appeared in The Sandman #10 (October 1989), which is part of the second story arc, The Doll's House.  The Corinthian is a nightmare created by Dream, who destroys him in the same collection for going rogue and failing to fulfill his original design. Dream later recreates him with "some changes", though the exact nature of these changes is not explicit.  His most notable physical feature is his lack of eyes: in their place, two rows of small, jagged teeth line each eye socket, which he often covers with sunglasses. He can speak, eat, see, and even respire through these mouths.

Boyd Holbrook portrayed the Corinthian in the first season of the Netflix television series The Sandman.

Abilities
The first Corinthian claims excellent eyesight, and is shown driving a car even while wearing sunglasses at night; but in the same volume, is shown consuming the eyes of humans through his own socket/mouths, which allows him to view their memories and even see the future. The Corinthian is also able to embody himself in human beings, whereof the eyes are consumed and replaced by teeth and the hair of the victim turns white. During the process, the eye sockets bleed profusely; but afterward, he resembles his victim in most features and can therefore impersonate it.

The second Corinthian resembles the first, but is very skilled at hand-to-hand combat and seems fearless.  During his search for Daniel Hall, the Corinthian, with little effort, kills a supernatural wolf with his bare hands, and later defeats Loki in single combat. He is also a skilled tracker; able locate targets across cities and realms with relative ease.   

In 1999, Neil Gaiman stated that the Corinthian is homosexual in The Sandman Companion, wherein the first Corinthian consumed eyes only of boys. In 2022, he identified the Corinthian as pansexual.  The second Corinthian is featured with a boyfriend as written by Caitlin R. Kiernan in the Dreaming.

In The Sandman television series, the audience does not witness many of the Corinthian's abilities. The Corinthian does consume eyes onscreen and receives a glimpse of the victim's memories, but that is the extent of the abilities displayed in the series.

Occurrences

The Sandman
The Corinthian is AWOL from the dreamscape following Morpheus's escape from capture, and masquerades as a serial killer who removes his victims' eyes; but Dream finds him shortly after saving Rose Walker. Here, Morpheus states that the Corinthian was "… created to be the darkness, and the fear of darkness in every human heart. A black mirror, made to reflect everything about itself that humanity will not confront"; but is deemed a failure for having done nothing other than gruesome murders, far short of Dream's intent. As punishment, Dream "uncreates" him, leaving a skull and some sand, and promises to improve upon him. Dream recreates the Corinthian in The Kindly Ones, wherein the Corinthian helps rescue and protect Daniel. In the process, he defeats Loki, and eats his eyes, after Loki, along with Puck, was holding the child hostage.

The Sandman Presents: The Corinthian
A three-issue miniseries called The Corinthian: Death In Venice tells how the first Corinthian entered the waking world and learned to murder human beings. In the series, the Corinthian displays his talent for possessing the bodies of the living, a process which causes the possessed body's hair to turn white and the eye sockets to bleed as the eyes are replaced (possibly eaten) by the Corinthian's teeth. The story takes place in Venice, in the year 1920, and includes such tangential plot elements as police corruption and anti-communist paranoia. The story also features Charles Constantine (a member of the same infamous family as John Constantine), a World War I veteran who has repeatedly struggled with his inability to kill. During the war, Charles refuses to bayonet a helpless young German soldier named Stefan Wasserman. In retribution, Charles's own commanding officer shoots Charles in the groin, castrating him, and shoots the young soldier in the head. Wasserman's body, however, had been inhabited by the dormant spirit of the Corinthian, who has haunted and pursued Charles, both in dreams and in reality, ever since Wasserman, a victim of a severe shell shock resulting from Dream's imprisonment, had committed suicide two years earlier.

The Corinthian wants someone to teach him "how to kill" and finds himself frustrated with Charles's inability to do violence even in self-defense. He eventually develops a rapport with Charles's traveling companion, a wealthy, traveling heiress who is degenerate and possibly insane. The woman claims that she cannot die, that she is the living incarnation of Pestilence, and refers to herself (and asks others to refer to her) by a new name each day, changing identities as she travels about. After she fatally shoots the Corinthian, and he survives by possessing the body of her young Italian lover, Amedeo, the woman recognizes the Corinthian as something other than human who can "become someone else." The two form a pact in which the woman agrees to teach the Corinthian how to murder, and the Corinthian agrees to teach her how to "stop being you."

The pivotal moment in the story comes while the characters are all attending the Venetian Carnival in costume. The woman, now calling herself Columbine, and the Corinthian Arlecchino murder another celebrant, but the Corinthian finds himself unable to take part, cursing himself. However, he eventually finds a way to fulfill both her promise to him and his promise to help the woman "stop being [herself]" by slitting her throat. Charles Constantine, happening upon them while dressed in his own carnival costume, finally steels himself and kills the Corinthian, who offers no resistance, with his own knife. The tale draws to a close with Charles leaving the country and the Corinthian beginning his murder spree, starting with Amedeo's young lover and the policeman guarding her in jail.

The Dreaming

The new Corinthian is back again in The Dreaming spinoff, returning to earth for the three-part "Souvenirs" storyline. Later in the series he hunts down a transgender woman named Echo, who was previously a murderer who cut out the eyes of her victims, following the instructions of her boyfriend Gabriel who was one of the only surviving victims of the first Corinthian. A result of this is the accidental death of Matthew the Raven. As punishment the Corinthian is turned into a mortal and Echo (made a cisgender female in the Dreaming) is given his position. As a mortal he develops compassion for humans and comes to understand fear, especially after the death of his lover Sila. He is eventually deemed fit to come back and serve as the Corinthian, with Daniel Hall finding another place for Echo.

Nightmare Country

The second Corinthian continues his duties as humanity's black mirror and has developed several methods to keep his more volatile impulses in check including keeping a record of the memories of his predecessor. During one of his haunts in a dream he encounters and is drawn into the mystery of the "Smiling Man" a rogue dream like entity outside of Morpheus's control, who has a connection to several unexplained deaths. Discovering how widespread the Smiling Man has become he petitions Morpheus to allow him to re-enter the waking world and track the entity down with the aid of Maddison Flynn; a young woman who has had her connection to the Dreaming tampered with by unseen forces but has the power to see the Smiling Man in the waking world.

Other occurrences
An exact double of the Corinthian's skull can be seen in the treasure chest of Daniel Hall during his brief Justice League of America occurrence. Dream placed the original Corinthian's skull in his personal chest, then crafted a new skull before infusing it into the new Corinthian, and this is likely the source.
The Corinthian makes a few brief but critical occurrences in Sandman Mystery Theater, where he is implied to be responsible for the mental derangement of some of the killers Wesley fights.

In other media

Audio drama
On July 15, 2020, Audible Originals 
published the 10 hour 54 minute audio-play "The Sandman" written by Gaiman and Dirk Maggs, performed by Gaiman and actors James McAvoy, Riz Ahmed, Kat Dennings, Taron Egerton, Samantha Morton, Bebe Neuwirth, Andy Serkis, and Michael Sheen. Ahmed voiced the character of The Corinthian.

Television

In June 2019,  Netflix signed a deal with Warner Bros. to produce the series and gave it an order of eleven episodes. According to The Hollywood Reporter, Warner Bros. pitched the series to multiple networks—including HBO, which declined to move ahead with it due to its massive budget. Netflix "snapped it up" as part of its attempts to obtain big intellectual properties and attract subscribers. The series was developed by Allan Heinberg, who will executive produce alongside Gaiman and Goyer. Gaiman said he would be more involved than he was with the television adaptation of his American Gods (2001), but less than he was with the adaptation of Good Omens (1990).

In January 2021, Tom Sturridge, Gwendoline Christie, Vivienne Acheampong, Boyd Holbrook, Charles Dance, Asim Chaudhry and Sanjeev Bhaskar were announced to be starring in the series with Holbrook portraying the character the Corinthian.

Name
The origin of the Corinthian's name is unclear. In a later story arc of Sandman, The Kindly Ones, Puck politely refuses to ask whether his name is taken from "the letters, the pillars, the leather, the place, or the mode of behavior." 
"The letters" is a reference to the First (and second) Epistle to the Corinthians, which uses a phrase similar to "dark mirror," as used by Dream to describe him.
"The pillars" is a reference to Corinthian columns.
"The leather" is referring to Corinthian leather.
"The place" refers to Corinth, Greece.
"The mode of behavior" (Corinthian behavior) is indulging in luxury and licentiousness.

In the Death In Venice miniseries, a beggar (who is not entirely reliable) claims that he exchanged one of his eyes for one offered to him by the Corinthian, and that he called him by the first thing he saw when he opened his new eye–a Corinthian pillar. Later in Death in Venice, the Corinthian refers to himself as "the dream rot."

According to an interview with Gaiman in The Sandman Companion, the Corinthian takes his name from the mode of behavior; specifically, "a Corinthian" was another term for a rake: a devil-may-care, ne'er-do-well.

In the television series, the Corinthian is asked if the name refers to the Biblical Corinthians, the Greek Corinth, or the leather, to which he replies, "Y'know, all of the above."

References

Fictional serial killers
Mythology in DC Comics
Comics characters introduced in 1989
Characters created by Neil Gaiman
DC Comics fantasy characters
DC Comics LGBT supervillains
Fictional gay males